The 1959 Mississippi State Maroons football team represented Mississippi State University as a member of the Southeastern Conference (SEC) during the 1959 NCAA University Division football season. Led by fourth-year head coach Wade Walker, the Maroons compiled an overall record of 2–7 with a mark of 0–7 in conference play, placing last out of 12 teams in the SEC.

Schedule

References

Mississippi State
Mississippi State Bulldogs football seasons
Mississippi State Maroons football